Ming Kum is an at-grade MTR Light Rail stop located at Ming Kum Road in Tuen Mun District, near Shan King Estate. It began service on 18 September 1988 and belongs to Zone 2. It serves Shan King Estate and nearby industrial areas.

Line 505 is only routed via Ming Kum stop in Sam Shing direction. It is routed via Shan King (South) and Shan King (North) in Siu Hong direction.

References

MTR Light Rail stops
Former Kowloon–Canton Railway stations
Tuen Mun District
Railway stations in Hong Kong opened in 1988